Cecelia Anne "Cece" Kizer (born August 7, 1997) is an American professional soccer player who plays as a forward or a midfielder for the Kansas City Current of the National Women's Soccer League (NWSL).

College career
Kizer played college soccer at Ole Miss from 2015 to 2018.

Club career
Kizer was drafted by Houston Dash in the 2nd round of the 2019 NWSL College Draft.

She was selected by Racing Louisville in the 2020 NWSL Expansion Draft.

Kizer scored the first goal for Racing Louisville in the 12th minute on a through ball from the team's No. 1 draft pick Emily Fox in the opening game of the Challenge Cup against the NWSL Orlando Pride on Saturday, April 10, 2021, to give the team a 1–0 lead. The inaugural game for Racing Louisville was held Lynn Family Stadium in Louisville. Racing Louisville tied the game in stoppage time on a goal by Brooke Hendrix.

Kizer scored seven goals and added three assists across all competitions in 2021. She again scored the first goal of the season for Racing Louisville in the 2022 NWSL Challenge Cup.

Kizer was traded along with Addisyn Merrick to the Kansas City Current on June 9, 2022

International career
She was called up to the United States national under-23 team in August 2019.

References

External links
 

1997 births
Living people
American women's soccer players
Houston Dash players
National Women's Soccer League players
Houston Dash draft picks
Ole Miss Rebels women's soccer players
Racing Louisville FC players
American expatriate sportspeople in Norway
Expatriate women's footballers in Norway
American expatriate women's soccer players
Soccer players from Kansas
Sportspeople from Overland Park, Kansas
Women's association football midfielders
Women's association football forwards